Clube Desportivo Real do Mbuco is an Angolan football club from the northern province of Cabinda. While originally from the village of Mbuco Zau, they are playing their home games at the Estádio do Tafe in the province's capital city of Cabinda.

In 2015, the club withdrew from the Gira Angola, citing financial reasons.

The team plays in the Gira Angola, the Angolan second division.

Achievements
Angolan League: 0

Angolan Cup: 0

Angolan SuperCup: 0

League & Cup Positions

Manager history
  João Manuel – 2018
  André Manuel – 2014

Players

See also
 Girabola
 Gira Angola

References

External links

Football clubs in Angola
Sports clubs in Angola